Uia di Ciamarella or just Ciamarella (3,676 m) is a mountain on the border between France and Italy.

SOIUSA classification 
According to the SOIUSA (International Standardized Mountain Subdivision of the Alps) the mountain can be classified in the following way:
 main part = Western Alps
 major sector = North Western Alps
 section = Graian Alps
 subsection = South-Eastern Graian Alps
 supergroup = catena Arnas-Ciamarella (It) / chaîne Ouille d'Arbéon - Ciamarella (Fr)
 group = gruppo Ciamarella-Mondrone 
 subgroup = sottogruppo della Ciamarella 
 code = I/B-7.I-B.6.a

References

Maps

 French  official cartography (Institut géographique national - IGN); on-line version: www.geoportail.fr
 Istituto Geografico Centrale - Carta dei sentieri e dei rifugi 1:50.000 nr 2 Valli di Lanzo e Moncenisio

Alpine three-thousanders
Mountains of the Alps
Mountains of Piedmont
Mountains of Savoie
Mountains of Auvergne-Rhône-Alpes
International mountains of Europe
Mountains partially in France